Georg Klein may refer to:

Georg Klein (composer) (born 1964), German composer
George Klein (biologist) (1925–2016), Hungarian-Swedish biologist and writer who uses the name Georg in Swedish texts
Georg Klein (writer) (born 1953), German author
 Georg Klein (volleyball) (born 1991), German volleyball player

See also
George Klein (disambiguation)